John Stewart McLennan (5 November 1853 – 15 September 1939) was a Conservative member of the Senate of Canada. He was born in Montreal, Quebec and became an industrialist and publisher.

The son of Hugh McLennan and Isabella Stewart, he was educated at the High School of Montreal, McGill University, and Concordia, and moved to Sydney, Nova Scotia. In 1904, he bought the Sydney Post (later the Post-Record). McLennan was married twice: to Louise Bradley in 1881 and to Grace Henoys Tytus in 1915. He was a director of Dominion Iron and Steel Company and the Dominion Coal Company. McLennan was the author of Louisbourg, from its foundation to its fall, 1713-1758,  first published in 1918.

He was appointed to the Senate on 10 February 1916 for the Sydney, Nova Scotia division following nomination by Prime Minister Robert Borden. McLennan remained a Senator until his death on 15 September 1939.

References

External links
 
 

1853 births
1939 deaths
Canadian publishers (people)
Canadian senators from Nova Scotia
High School of Montreal alumni
Conservative Party of Canada (1867–1942) senators
Politicians from Montreal
McGill University alumni